The Chenggong Coastal Defense Tunnel is a tunnel in Jinhu, Kinmen County, Taiwan.

Geology
The tunnel was dug through granite layers of rock and concrete.

Architecture
The tunnel is equipped with various military equipment, including command post, pillbox, barracks, toilets and kitchen. It spans over a length of 560 meters. It is divided into section, which are the section towards the sea and section leads to the village office.

See also
 List of tourist attractions in Taiwan

References

Jinhu Township
Military history of Taiwan
Tunnels in Kinmen County
Tunnel warfare